Pal Homonai (Irig, May, 5th 1904 – Kecskemét, June, 12th 2010), was a Serbian-Hungarian Naïve art painter.

Biography 
Homonai was born to a peasant family in Irig on 28 May 1922. He spent his childhood on pastures of the villages in Srem, which was to become the primary source of his inspiration. He mastered the carpentry in 1938 and moved to Novi Sad, where he practiced various forms of the craft, intarsia, etc. He began doing painting in 1964. His first independent exhibition at Đuro Salaj Gallery in Belgrade in 1968, was, among others, visited by Oto Bihalji-Merin and Bolumil Karlavaris who wrote first commendable reviews. He lived and worked in Novi Sad until 1992, when he moved to Kecskemét where he stayed until his death on 6 December 2010.

Artistic style and work 
He portrays rural subjects, but also the facades of old town buildings. With his original painting style, he creates stylized compositions of pastures, wheat fields, country fairs, harvests and weddings in various seasons. Like someone observing the distance from the cliff of his artistic mind, he creates a panoramic view. There is a lot of free space in his paintings where life events are often synthesized like miniatures. By shifting from hills to planes, from striped to dotty furrows, from human to animal figures, he stresses the sound and rhythm of his compositions.

Exhibitions and awards 
His paintings are on permanent display of galleries and museums worldwide. Great and representative collections of his works are in Museum of Naïve and Marginal Art (MNMA), Jagodina, Serbia. He was many times awarded for his work. At the Eleventh International Biennial of Naïve and Marginal Art, of MNMA, Jagodina, 2003, he received the Award for Entire Artistic Work.

References

Literature 
 М. Бошковић; М. Маширевић,Самоуки ликовни уметници у Србији,Торино, 1977
 Oto Bihalji-Merin; Небојша Бато Томашевић, Енциклопедија наивне уметности света, Београд, 1984
 Н. Крстић, Наивна уметност Србије, САНУ, МНМУ, Јагодина, 2003
 Н. Крстић, Наивна и маргинална уметност Србије, МНМУ, Јагодина, 2007
 Ивана Јовановић, Пал Хомонаи, МНМУ, Јагодина, 2007

External links 

 Pal Homonai, Museum of Naïve and Marginal Art, Jagodina, Serbia

20th-century births
2010 deaths
Naïve painters
Hungarian painters
20th-century Serbian painters
Serbian male painters
20th-century Serbian male artists